Custis Tombs, also known as Custis cemetery at Arlington, is a historic family burial ground located near Cheapside, Northampton County, Virginia. It consists of two tombs surrounded by a poured concrete platform raised a few inches above ground level. It includes the grave of John Custis (c. 1629–1696), Major General and member of the Council for Virginia and progenitor of the Custis family in America.  The other tomb is the box-like marble tomb of John Custis IV (1678–1749) with its pyramidal top and drapery carvings on the long sides.  The tombs were associated with Arlington mansion and located west of the separately listed Arlington Archeological Site.

The site was listed on the National Register of Historic Places in 1970.

References

External links

 Arlington, Custis Tombs, Old Plantation Creek & State Route 644, Capeville, Northampton County, VA 3 photos, 2 data pages, and 1 photo caption page at Historic American Buildings Survey
 

Historic American Buildings Survey in Virginia
Custis family of Virginia
Cemeteries on the National Register of Historic Places in Virginia
National Register of Historic Places in Northampton County, Virginia